Pjesma samo o njoj (English translation: A Song Only About Her) is the second studio album by Bosnian singer Halid Bešlić. It was released in 1982.

Track listing
Pjesma samo o njoj (A Song Only About Her)
Do ljubavi tvoje mi je stalo (Because Of Your Love, I Care)
Ta je žena varala me (That Woman Cheated on Me)
Samo s tobom lijepo mi je (Only with You It's Nice for Me)
Domovino, u srcu te nosimo (Home, in Our Hearts We Carry You)
Volim te, neka svako zna (I Love You, I Want Everyone to Know)
Zašto su ti oči tužne (Why Are Your Eyes Sad?)
Uspomeno, uspomeno (Memory, Memory)

References

Halid Bešlić albums
1982 albums